Seite an Seite (English: Side by Side) is the seventh studio album by Austrian recording artist Christina Stürmer. It was released by Polydor Records on 22 April 2016 in German-speaking Europe.

Track listing

Charts

Weekly charts

Year-end charts

Certifications

References

External links 
 

Christina Stürmer albums
2016 albums
Polydor Records albums
German-language albums